Casual Gods is the second album by American musician Jerry Harrison, released in January 1988 by Sire Records in the U.S. and Fontana Records in the UK and Europe. His third album, Walk on Water, would also bear the Casual Gods name as a proxy for the band.

The track "Man with a Gun" was featured in the 1988 film Two Moon Junction, and the instrumental version of the same song was used in the 1986 Jonathan Demme film Something Wild. The track "Cherokee Chief" first appeared on the 1987 Sire Records promotional sampler Just Say Yes. The single "Rev It Up" peaked at No. 7 on the U.S. Album Rock Tracks chart. The album cover features a photograph of the Serra Pelada gold mine by Brazilian photographer Sebastião Salgado.

Track listing
All tracks were written by Jerry Harrison, except where indicated.

"Rev It Up" (Jerry Harrison, John Sieger, Ernie Brooks) – 4:17
"Song of Angels" – 3:35
"Man with a Gun" – 4:35
"Let It Come Down" – 4:52
"Cherokee Chief" (Harrison, Brooks) – 4:30
"A Perfect Lie" (Harrison, Arthur Russell, Brooks) – 4:25
"Are You Running?" (Harrison, Brooks, Monique Dayan) – 4:20
"Breakdown in the Passing Lane" – 4:37
"A.K.A. Love" (Harrison, Brooks) – 4:10
"We're Always Talking" (Harrison, Brooks) – 4:40
"Bobby" (Harrison, Brooks) – 4:03
"Bobby" (Extended Mix) (Harrison, Brooks) – 6:58

The extended mix of "Bobby" did not appear on the LP or cassette versions of the album, but was featured as the B-side of the "Rev It Up" 7-inch single. "Breakdown in the Passing Lane" was not on the original U.S. LP release.

Personnel 

Jerry Harrison – guitar, keyboards, vocals

Additional musicians
Alex Weir – guitars (tracks 1–10), bass guitar (tracks 2–3, 5, 8–10)
Chris Spedding – guitars (tracks 1, 5)
Robbie McIntosh – guitars (tracks 5–6)
Rick Jaeger – drums (tracks 1, 5–12)
David Van Tieghem – drums (track 2), percussion (tracks 4–5)
Yogi Horton – drums (track 3)
Bernie Worrell – keyboards; bass synthesizer (track 6)
Jim Liban – horns; harmonica (track 8)
Dickie Landry – horns; saxophone (track 6)
Arlene Holmes – background vocals (tracks 1, 2–4, 7)
Lovelace Richmond – background vocals (tracks 2–4)
Arthur Russell – background vocals (track 6)
Joyce Bowden – background vocals (track 6)
Monique Dayan – background vocals (track 5)
Ernie Brooks – background vocals (track 8)

Technical
Jerry Harrison – producer
Ernie Brooks – assistant producer
Sebastião Salgado – photography
David Vartanian – engineer (tracks 1–8, 10–12), overdub engineer; mixing (track 11)
Jay Mark – engineer (track 9), mixing (tracks 6, 8)
David Avidor – overdub recording
Robin Laine – overdub recording
Eric "E.T." Thorngren – overdub recording; mixing (tracks 2–3, 5, 10) 
John "Tokes" Potoker – overdub recording; mixing (tracks 1, 4, 7, 9, 12); additional engineering (track 6)
J.C. Convertino – overdub recording 
Don Peterkofsky – studio assistant
Nick Delro – studio assistant
Tony Masciarotte – studio assistant
Mark Roule – studio assistant
Fernando Kral – studio assistant
Stan Katayama – studio assistant
Tom Vercillo – studio assistant
Bob Brackman – studio assistant
Jack Skinner – mastering
M&Co. – album art design

Charts

References

External links
 Album review

1988 albums
Sire Records albums
Jerry Harrison albums
Albums produced by Jerry Harrison
Fontana Records albums